This is a list of Cypriot football transfers for the 2009–10 summer transfer window by club. Only transfers of the Cypriot First Division are included.

The summer transfer window opened on 1 June 2009, although a few transfers took place prior to that date. The window closed on 31 August 2009. Players without a club may join one at any time, either during or in between transfer windows.

Marfin Laiki League

AEL Limassol

In:

Out:

AEP Paphos

In:

Out:

Anorthosis

In:

Out:

APEP Pitsilia

In:

Out:

APOEL

In:

Out:

Apollon Limassol

In:

Out:

APOP Kinyras Peyias

In:

Out:

Aris Limassol

In:

Out:

Doxa Katokopia

In:

Out:

Enosis Neon Paralimni

In:

Out:

Ermis Aradippou

In:

 

Out:

Ethnikos Achna

In:

Out:

Nea Salamina

In:

Out:

Omonia

In:

Out:

References

See also
List of Belgian football transfers summer 2009
List of Bulgarian football transfers summer 2009
List of Danish football transfers summer 2009
List of Dutch football transfers summer 2009
List of English football transfers summer 2009
List of German football transfers summer 2009
List of Greek football transfers summer 2009
List of 2009–10 Israeli football transfers
List of Italian football transfers summer 2009
List of Maltese football transfers summer 2009
List of Scottish football transfers 2009–10
List of Spanish football transfers summer 2009
List of Ukrainian football transfers summer 2009

Cypriot
Transfers
2009-10